Cristian Emanuel Bălgrădean (born 21 March 1988) is a Romanian professional footballer who plays for Liga I club CFR Cluj as a goalkeeper.

Since making his debut in the first division in 2010, Bălgrădean has amassed over 200 matches in the competition for Dinamo București, Universitatea Craiova, FCSB, and CFR Cluj, among others. With the former team, he won the Cupa României and the Supercupa României in 2012, and with the latter the Liga I and the Supercupa României in 2021.

Bălgrădean registered his full debut for the Romania national team in November 2011, in a 3–1 friendly victory over Greece.

Club career
Bălgrădean started his career as a youngster at Helmuth Duckadam football school in Arad. After the school was disbanded, he joined the junior groups of Atletico Arad. In 2005, he signed his first professional contract with Minerul Lupeni. His evolution was impressive, and he was bought by FC Brașov. In 2008, he was transferred permanently by Liberty Salonta. From the Bihor team, Bălgrădean was called to the Romania U-21 team. In 2009, he returns home to Arad, being bought by Gloria Arad, and then loaned to UTA Arad.

In June 2010 he signed a contract for five seasons with Dinamo București. He failed to gain a position in the first squad and was loaned for a season at Unirea Urziceni. In the Winter break, Bălgrădean was called back to Dinamo by Ioan Andone who decided to give him a chance in the first 11 after an injury of Emilian Dolha. He kept his position after Andone was replaced with Liviu Ciobotariu in July 2011.

Following the arrival of Dario Bonetti as head-coach, Bălgrădean initially lost his place in the first team when the Italian manager chose Kristijan Naumovski as first goalkeeper. After a while, the two players were used alternately because they both became eligible for their national teams and for a possible future transfer.

In July 2014, Bălgrădean was released by Dinamo.

On 26 August, he signed a contract with the newly promoted in Liga I, Universitatea Craiova.

On 19 February 2018, he agreed to a two-and-a-half-year deal with FCSB.

On 1 July 2020, he left FCSB to join CFR Cluj.

International career
Bălgrădean became a senior Romania international on 15 November 2011, when he played the full 90 minutes in a 3–1 friendly win against Greece.

Career statistics

Club

International

Honours
Dinamo București
Cupa României: 2011–12
Supercupa României: 2012

Concordia Chiajna
Cupa Ligii runner-up: 2015–16

CFR Cluj
Liga I: 2020–21, 2021–22
Supercupa României: 2020

References

External links

1988 births
Living people
People from Timiș County
Romanian footballers
Association football goalkeepers
Liga I players
Liga II players
CS Minerul Lupeni players
FC Brașov (1936) players
CF Liberty Oradea players
FC UTA Arad players
FC Dinamo București players
FC Unirea Urziceni players
CS Universitatea Craiova players
CS Concordia Chiajna players
FC Steaua București players
CFR Cluj players
Romania youth international footballers
Romania international footballers